Onslow may refer to:

Places
Onslow, Western Australia, Australia, a town
Onslow, Nova Scotia, Canada, an unincorporated community
Onslow Speedway
Borough of Onslow, New Zealand
Onslow (New Zealand electorate), a New Zealand parliamentary electorate
Lake Onslow, New Zealand, a man-made lake
Onslow Village, an area of Guildford, Surrey, UK
Onslow, Iowa, U.S.
Onslow County, North Carolina, U.S.
Onslow Bay, North Carolina, U.S.

Ships
 HMS Onslow (1916), an Admiralty M-class destroyer
 HMS Onslow (G17), an O-class destroyer launched in March 1941
 HMS Pakeham, a destroyer launched in January 1941 that exchanged named with the O-class destroyer before commissioning
 HMAS Onslow, a submarine of the Royal Australian Navy
 USS Onslow (AVP-48), a United States Navy seaplane tender

Titles
Earl of Onslow, an extant title in the Peerage of the United Kingdom
Onslow baronets, two titles, both extant

People
Onslow (surname)
Onslow (given name)

Other uses
Onslow (Keeping Up Appearances), a character on Keeping Up Appearances
Onslow College, a secondary school in Wellington, New Zealand
Onslow AFC, a defunct association football club from Wellington, New Zealand